Johannes Petrus Meintjes (19 May 1923 – 7 July 1980) was a South African artist and writer.

Meintjes grew up on his family's farm in the mountains near Molteno. 
He lived and worked in Cape Town for several years, taught art, travelled for exhibitions and won a range of South African and international awards.
In 1965 he retired to Molteno, where he focused on his writing. He went on to win several literary awards.

References

South African artists
1923 births
1980 deaths
Alumni of Hoërskool Jan van Riebeeck